Lion Brewing and Malting Company of Jerningham Street, Lower North Adelaide was one of the many breweries which proliferated in Australia in the nineteenth-century.  In those days beer was much cheaper than now; the wholesale price was 1/ a gallon, but transport was expensive, and small breweries were to be found all over the country. Most of these have now disappeared, having either closed down or become merged in larger businesses. Lion Brewing and Malting eventually confined itself to malting barley and manufacture of aerated waters and cordials.

The company was floated in 1888 in order to secure the brewing, hotel and property assets of Beaglehole and Johnston, issuing 75,000 shares of £1 each. The company owned many hotels in South Australia including the Cross Keys Hotel at Dry Creek (and subdivided around 20 acres adjacent in 1912), the Flagstaff Hotel, Darlington, the Oriental Hotel in Osmond Terrace, Norwood and the Bath Hotel at 91 King William Street in the city. Later in the 20th century it became a shareholder in another major hotel owner, Knapman and Sons, and bought out that company in 1973.

Johnston brothers
Andrew Galbraith Johnston (1827 – 18 December 1886), James Johnston (1818 – 12 April 1891) and three other brothers, all of Campbeltown, Scotland, arrived in South Australia on the Buckinghamshire early in 1839 with their father, who soon built one of South Australia's first malthouses and founded the town of Oakbank. He served a ten-year apprenticeship as a draper, then opened a shop in Reedy Creek which he left for the goldfields. He was quite successful and with his brother James, after a brief stint as a miller in Bridgewater, joined his father's brewing business and together built it into a highly profitable business.

James Johnston was one of the best-known men in the south, as his firm had business connections and valuable hotel property in all the principal centres of the district. He took an active interest in the politics of the Onkaparinga district and was generous in his support of the Woodside and Mount Barker Institutes. He was one of the founders of the Mount Barker   Agricultural Society (missing only one of its first 44 annual shows) and with his brother Andrew was an active promoter of the Onkaparinga Racing Club (now Oakbank Racing Club), and its Great Eastern Steeplechase, first run in 1876. He was an enthusiastic proponent of "acclimatisation of useful species" and stocked the district about his home with Californian quail, and filled the Onkaparinga with perch.  He married Margaret "Minnie" Disher (died 11 April 1900), a sister of Eliza, Lady Milne. The Disher family arrived in Adelaide aboard Palmyra in October 1839.

James's son John Disher Johnston (1850–1916) was a partner in the brewery. Another son, James Steele Johnston (1870 – 22? May 1892) was partner in the Broken Hill, New South Wales brewing firm of Simpson, Johnston and Co.

W. H. Beaglehole
For more details see main article

William Henry Beaglehole (6 May 1834 – 1 June 1917) was born at Helston, Cornwall, and came to South Australia at the age of 15. He worked as a builder, then joined rush to the goldfields of Victoria, where he had some success. He operated as a builder and developer in the copper-mining towns of Kadina, Wallaroo, and Moonta, where he was for eight years landlord of the Royal Hotel. He represented the district for six years in the South Australian House of Assembly.

He founded the firm Beaglehole and Johnston with James and Andrew Galbraith Johnston, owners of the Oakbank Brewery. In 1884 he founded the Lion Brewing and Malting Company and was elected chairman of directors. He founded the Waverley Brewery at Broken Hill (later purchased by the South Australian Brewing Company). He started a distillery at Thebarton, which was subsequently acquired by Milne and Co. He was one of the first ≠members of the South Australian Licensed Victuallers' Association. He was one of the founders of the Grand Hotel in Melbourne.

F. A. Chapman
Frederick Arthur Chapman (10 March 1864 – 18 September 1925) was born in Stepney, South Australia, the son of Arthur Chapman, one of Adelaide's best-known hotel brokers. He was educated at Grote Street State School, J. L. Young's Adelaide Educational Institution and Prince Alfred College. He entered the brewing trade as an apprentice under Mr. G. Gray at the Lion Brewery and remained with the company all his life. At 18 be was sent out as a traveller, and became acquainted with most aspects of hotel management. He worked in every branch of the trade and at the age of 25 he was appointed company secretary. By then the company had ceased brewing to concentrate on production of malt, aerated beverages and cordials. His duties took him periodically to Sydney, Brisbane, and Perth, where the company had customers for its malt among the leading breweries.

He was for some time secretary of the South Australian Associated Brewers and the Brewers' Association. On many occasions he represented the brewing interest at conferences and in Arbitration Court cases. He was a director of the Cooperative Bottle Company, and was for a time chairman of the finance committee of the Chamber of Manufacturers.

For six years he was a member cf the Church of England Synod's financial board, and for many years a synodsman and lay reader of the Church.

He was a prominent Freemason and a member of the Commercial Travellers' Association for over 30 years.

Chapman died of a heart attack on the Melbourne Express on his way to Victoria where he was to holiday with his brother, L. Chapman of Western Australia. He left a widow Marian (née Kingsborough), two sons: Dr. A. Chapman (superintendent of the Adelaide Dental Hospital) and Mr. S. Chapman (secretary of the Lion Brewing Company) and a daughter, Elma Chapman.

S. I. Chapman
Stanley Irwin Chapman (1892 –29 September 1940), a son of F. A. Chapman, was educated at St. Peter's College, then worked for some years with Burns, Philp and Company Ltd. in New Guinea. When war broke out in 1914 he joined the navy, and on return to Sydney transferred to the army as staff sergeant. After the war he joined Lion Brewing and eventually succeeded his father as manager. He was an active member of the Returned Soldiers' League and of St. Peter's Old Collegians' Association.

M. Sharman
Listed in Sands and MacDougalls Directory 1962 as company manager.

References

Bibliography
Painter, Alison Brewers & hoteliers : the Johnstons of Oakbank 

Food and drink companies of Australia
Manufacturing companies based in Adelaide
Australian beer brands
Beer brewing companies based in South Australia
Breweries in Australia
History of Adelaide